Christ Episcopal Church is an historic Carpenter Gothic Episcopal church located at 425 North Cherry Street in Monticello, Florida in the United States. Designed by T.M. Feruson of Georgia in the Carpenter Gothic style of architecture with some stick-style detailing, it was built in 1885 to replace a previous church building which burned in 1883. Its steep roof, lancet windows and side belfry and entrance are typical of Carpenter Gothic churches. The church had been organized in 1840 by local Episcopalians who had previously held lay services in their homes.  It is still an active parish in the Episcopal Diocese of Florida. The Rev. Mal Jopling is its current rector.

The building is a contributing property in the Monticello Historic District, which was added to the National Register of Historic Places on August 19, 1977.

In 1989, Christ Episcopal Church was listed in A Guide to Florida's Historic Architecture, published by the University of Florida Press.

Christ Episcopal Church was also featured in the 2009 Historic Episcopal Churches Engagement Calendar published by the National Episcopal Historians and Archivists.

See also

 Christ Episcopal Church (disambiguation)

References

External links
 Church website

Episcopal church buildings in Florida
Carpenter Gothic church buildings in Florida
Historic district contributing properties in Florida
Churches in Jefferson County, Florida
Monticello, Florida
National Register of Historic Places in Jefferson County, Florida
1885 establishments in Florida
Churches completed in 1885